Matteo Perrotti (born 17 April 1999) is an Italian footballer who plays as a midfielder for Clodiense.

Career statistics

Notes

References

1999 births
Living people
Italian footballers
Association football midfielders
A.S. Pro Piacenza 1919 players
Serie C players
Serie D players